Defence in depth may refer to:

 Defence in depth - a military strategy
 Defence-in-depth (Roman military) - a military tactic of the Roman Empire
 Defence in depth (non-military) 
 Defense in depth (computing)
 Defense in depth (nuclear engineering)